Patrick Huisman (born 23 August 1966) is a Dutch auto racing driver. He won the Porsche Supercup one-make sports car series four times between 1997 and 2000, and resulted second in 2005, third in 1996 and 2006, and fourth in 1995, 2003, 2006, 2007, 2008 and 2009. He also got the class win at the 1999 24 Hours of Le Mans and 12 Hours of Sebring driving a Porsche 911. Duncan Huisman is his younger brother.

Racing record

24 Hours of Le Mans results

Complete Deutsche Tourenwagen Masters results
(key) (Races in bold indicate pole position) (Races in italics indicate fastest lap)

† — Retired, but was classified as he completed 90% of the winner's race distance.

Partial Porsche Supercup results
(key) (Races in bold indicate pole position) (Races in italics indicate fastest lap)

References

External links
 Patrick Huisman official website 
 Patrick Huisman statistics at Driver Database
 Patrick Huisman statistics at Speedsport Magazine

1966 births
Living people
Dutch racing drivers
FIA GT Championship drivers
Deutsche Tourenwagen Masters drivers
24 Hours of Le Mans drivers
Porsche Supercup drivers
ADAC GT Masters drivers
24 Hours of Daytona drivers
People from Elburg
24 Hours of Spa drivers
WeatherTech SportsCar Championship drivers
24H Series drivers
Oreca drivers
Team Rosberg drivers
Walter Lechner Racing drivers
Mercedes-AMG Motorsport drivers
BMW M drivers
Sportspeople from Gelderland
Larbre Compétition drivers
Phoenix Racing drivers
Nürburgring 24 Hours drivers
Porsche Carrera Cup Germany drivers